George Daniel was the third Bishop of East Kerela of the Church of South India:

Notes

 

 

21st-century Anglican bishops in India
Indian bishops
Indian Christian religious leaders
Anglican bishops of East Kerala